The Swiss Party of Labour is a communist party in Switzerland. It is associated with the European United Left–Nordic Green Left group in the European Parliament, although Switzerland is not in the EU.

History
The party was founded in 1944 by the illegal Communist Party of Switzerland. On 21 May the constituent conference of the Basel Federation of the party was held. On 14–15 October the same year the first Party Congress of the party was held in Zürich. Léon Nicole was elected President and Karl Hofmaier General Secretary. On 6–7 October 1945 the Second Congress was held in Geneva. By this time the party had 20 000 members. On 30 November - 1 December the 3rd Congress in Zürich. On 27 July a Swiss Party Conference was held in Bern. Karl Hofmaier was removed from his position due to a financial scandal. In the national elections of 1947 the party received 5.1% of the vote.
 
On 4–6 July 1949 the 4th Congress was held. Steps to strengthen the organization as a Cadre Party were taken. Edgar Woog elected General Secretary. In 1950, the party worked intensively for the Stockholm Appeal. 260 000 signatures were collected in Switzerland. From 31 May to 2 June 1952 the 5th Congress was held in Geneva. On 7 December the Central Committee expelled Léon Nicole from the party. On 28–30 May the 6th Congress was held in Geneva.

The 7th Congress was held in Geneva from 16 to 18 May 1959. A new party programme approved with the concept of antimonopolistic unity, "Swiss Road to Socialism" (inspired by the similar programme of the Communist Party of Great Britain). The 8th Congress was held in Geneva from 16 to 18 May 1964. As of 2015, the party had no seats in the Swiss cantonal councils and was not represented in any of the 26 cantonal governments.

The XXII Congress of the section of the Ticino, held on 10 November 2013, marked the unification of the organs partisan Ticino with those of the Italian Grisons, creating the Communist Party of Southern Switzerland, which after 2014 has stopped the collaboration with the Swiss Party of Labour, becoming the Communist Party, which is not active on a national level.

2007 national elections
Holding two seats in the Swiss National Council (the lower or first chamber of the Swiss parliament) going into the 2007 elections, the party stood candidates in the cantons of Zürich, Vaud, Geneva and the Ticino on their own; in Neuchâtel the candidate appeared on a joint list with Solidarity. While the share of the vote in 2007 was similar to the party's 2003 results (0.7%), the party lost the seat held by Josef Zisyadis, while retaining the seat held by Marianne Huguenin. However, on 1 November 2007 Huguenin announced her resignation from the National Council to focus on her position as mayor of Renens, Vaud, leaving Zisyadis to take the Party's seat in the National Council representing Vaud.

Electoral performance

National results

Cantonal-level 

1.* indicates that the party was not on the ballot in this canton.
2.Combined result for PdA and Solidarity.
3.Part of the Canton of Bern until 1979.

References

External links
The Swiss Workers Party in   History of Social Security in Switzerland

Communist parties in Switzerland
Political parties established in 1944
Party of the European Left member parties
1944 establishments in Switzerland
Socialist parties in Switzerland
Marxist parties
Left-wing parties
Far-left political parties